Robert Raymer (born August 3, 1956) is an American writer and writing facilitator from Grove City, Pennsylvania, who now lives in Kuching, Sarawak on the island of Borneo.

Biography
After graduating from Miami University in Oxford, Ohio, he was a regional manager for Kinko, in charge of 11 stores in three states before moving to Penang, Malaysia where he lived for 21 years and taught creative writing at Universiti Sains Malaysia.  He also taught creative writing at Universiti Malaysia Sarawak.  He is the author of a collection of short stories set in Malaysia (Lovers and Strangers Revisited, MPH Group, 2008), a collection of creative nonfiction (Tropical Affairs, MPH, 2009), and a travel book (Spirit of Malaysia, Editions Didier Millet, 2011).

Named as one of the "50 Expats You Should Know in Malaysia" by Expatriate Lifestyle magazine (January 2010), Robert Raymer's short stories and articles have appeared in many publications including The Literary Review, London Magazine, Thema, Descant, The Writer and Reader's Digest.  One story from Lovers and Strangers Revisited has been used for the Cambridge International Examinations and others have been taught in Malaysian universities, private colleges and Sijil Pelajaran Malaysia literature in secondary schools, as well as in a high school in Canada. He was the editor of Silverfish New Writings 4. Three of his novels have been "short-list" finalists in the 2009 and 2011 Faulkner-Wisdom Novel Competition.

Robert Raymer now lives with his wife Jenny (a Bidayuh from Sarawak) and their two children, Jason and Justin.  He has a son Zaini from a previous marriage who is featured in Tropical Affairs, now studying in Kuala Lumpur.

Publications

Lovers and Strangers Revisited

Lovers and Strangers Revisited (MPH, 2008), a collection of 17 short stories set mostly in Malaysia, was the winner of the 2009 Popular-The Star Reader's Choice Awards. The original collection, Lovers and Strangers, was published by Heinemann Asia (1993) under the Writing in Asia Series then republished as Lovers and Strangers Revised (Silverfish, 2005). The Story Behind the Story is a blog series about each story in the collection, starting with "On Fridays".  The collection has been translated into French under the title Trois Autres Malaisie (Editions GOPE, 2011).

Tropical Affairs

Tropical Affairs: Episodes from an Expat's Life in Malaysia (MPH, 2009), nominated for the 2010 Popular-The Star Readers Choice Awards, is a collection of creative nonfiction about Raymer's experiences of living in Malaysia for over twenty years, including being an extra in three Hollywood films (Anna and the King, Paradise Road, Beyond Rangoon) and the French film, Indochine, which won an Academy Award for Best Foreign Language Film in 1992.

Spirit of Malaysia

Spirit of Malaysia (Editions Didier Millet, 2011) is a travel-guide, souvenir book with up-to-date photographs that capture the spirit of modern Malaysia.

References

External links
 Robert Raymer's website
 Robert Raymer's blog
 Writer from the cold - Robert Raymer in Time Out KL
 Interview of Robert Raymer on Life & Style Malaysia
 Interview of Robert Raymer on Creative Writing Now

Living people
1956 births
Miami University alumni
People from Grove City, Pennsylvania
People from Kuching
People from Sarawak
American expatriates in Malaysia
American male writers